Lakshmi Deepak (born P. Lakshmi Deepak) was an Indian film director and producer known for his works predominantly in Telugu cinema, and a few Tamil films In 1972, he directed Pandanti Kapuram, which won the National Film Award for Best Feature Film in Telugu, for that year.

Filmography
1986 Dhairyavanthudu
1982 Telugu Nadu 
1981 Maha Purushudu 
1980 Dharma Chakram 
1980 Sannayi Appanna
1979 Edadugula Anubandham 
1979 Karthika Deepam
1976 Vinta Illu Santa Gola 
1975 Ee Kalapu Pillalu 
1975 Makalo Marumakalo
1975 Naakoo Swatantram Vachchindi 
1975 Vayasochchina Pilla
1974 Harati 
1974 Inti Kodalu 
1973 Anbu Sagodharargal
1973 Gandhi Puttina Desham 
1972 Guduputani
1972 Pandanti Kapuram 
1971 Jagat Jentreelu 
1971 Kooturu Kodalu 
1970 Pachchani Samsaram

Awards
National Film Awards 
National Film Award for Best Feature Film in Telugu (director) - Pandanti Kapuram (1972)

Filmfare Awards South
Filmfare Best Film Award (Telugu) - Pandanti Kapuram (1972)

References

Telugu film directors
Telugu film producers
Filmfare Awards South winners
Living people
Film producers from Andhra Pradesh
Tamil film producers
20th-century Indian film directors
Year of birth missing (living people)